Gustav Hermann Schmischke (born 19 December 1883 - death date unknown) was the Nazi Party Gauleiter of Gau Anhalt and, later, Gau Anhalt-North Saxony Province (Gau Anhalt-Provinz Sachsen Nord).

Early life
Schmischke was born in Reichertswalde, East Prussia (today the village of Markowo, Ostróda County, Poland). He attended volksschule and gymnasium through 1903. He then studied at the University of Heidelberg, earning a degree in medicine in 1910. In 1913, he went into private practice as a general practitioner. In 1924 he was elected to the Landtag of Anhalt, serving until 1928.

Nazi Party career
On 6 July 1925 Schmischke joined the Nazi Party (membership number 9,355) and on 17 July 1925 he was entrusted with the leadership of Gau Anhalt, replacing Dr. Tesch of Bernburg as Gauleiter. He worked at strengthening the internal cohesion of the Party and building a more efficient organization, and succeeded in forming several new local branches.
 
On 1 September 1926, Schmischke's jurisdiction was enlarged by a merger with the two neighboring Gaue of Magdeburg and Elbe-Havel. The new district was named Gau Anhalt-North Saxony Province. However, after differences developed between Schmischke and the Ortsgruppe (Local Group) in Dessau, he submitted his resignation on 28 February 1927. This was approved on 1 April 1927 and he was succeeded by his Deputy Gauleiter, Wilhelm Friedrich Loeper.

Schmischke subsequently served as the Gau Representative for Population and Racial Policy. In 1935 he became the department head in the Party's Office of Public Health in Gau Magdeburg-Anhalt. In November 1941 he was named Gaugehundsheitsführer (Gau Health Leader). Schmischke was a recipient of the Golden Party Badge. Nothing further is known of his subsequent life.

References

Sources

1883 births
Year of death unknown
Gauleiters
German general practitioners
Nazi Party officials
Nazi Party politicians
People from East Prussia
Physicians in the Nazi Party